Anar Khan (born 4 October 1939) is a Pakistani middle-distance runner. He competed in the men's 800 metres at the 1964 Summer Olympics.

References

1939 births
Living people
Athletes (track and field) at the 1964 Summer Olympics
Pakistani male middle-distance runners
Olympic athletes of Pakistan
Athletes (track and field) at the 1962 British Empire and Commonwealth Games
Commonwealth Games competitors for Pakistan
Place of birth missing (living people)